The Vinyl Countdown is the fourth EP by Christian rock band Relient K, released exclusively on a clear red 7" vinyl record on Mono Vs Stereo Records. It was released in 2003, a few months after the band's third full-length album, Two Lefts Don't Make a Right...but Three Do was released. The Vinyl Countdown was followed a few months later by the band's Christmas CD, Deck the Halls, Bruise Your Hand, giving the band three releases in one year, and also the second recording on MVS.

The 7" was dedicated to super fan Jesse Alkire (with a note in the bottom corner of the vinyl sleeve reading "Here's to Jesse Alkire").

Track listing
All songs written by Matt Thiessen

Side A
"The Vinyl Countdown" – 2:35
"Five Iron Frenzy Is Either Dead or Dying" – 0:28

Side B
"We're Nothing Without You" – 3:47
"Five Iron Frenzy Is Either Dead or Dying (Wannabe Ska Version)" – 0:38

Personnel
Relient K
Matt Thiessen – lead vocals, guitar, piano
Matt Hoopes – guitar, backing vocals
Brian Pittman – bass
Dave Douglas – drums, backing vocals (drums on "We're Nothing Without You only)
Additional production
Brett Schoneman (of Philmore) - drums (all but "We're Nothing Without You")
Mark Lee Townsend - producer

The credits in the booklet of The Bird and the Bee Sides showed that Philmore drummer and former Relient K fill in drummer, Brett Schoneman, played drums on every song of this EP except "We're Nothing Without You".

Notes
The dual songs entitled "Five Iron Frenzy Is Either Dead or Dying" were made to pay tribute to the Christian ska band of the same name, as they had broken up earlier in the year.  The songs are filled with humor similar to what the band was known for in their lyrical style.

Relient K EPs
2003 EPs

fr:The Vinyl Countdown